Yelnya Reserve (or Elnya) is the biggest swamp complex in Belarus. The swamps cover 253.01 square kilometers and considered to be more than 9000 years old. The Landscape Reserve "Yelnya" was founded in 1968.

Biodiversity 
Yelnya swamp is a stopping point for birds that migrate from the north through Belarus for wintering in Israel and North Africa. About 50 pairs of cranes stay here for nesting.

More than 405 species of plants grow in the bog, 13 of them are listed as an endangered species. Approximately 150 bird species live and nest here.

References 

National parks of Belarus
Protected areas established in 1968
Ramsar sites in Belarus
Marshes of Belarus